Live from Austin, Texas is a live video by Stevie Ray Vaughan and Double Trouble. It is a retrospective of the band's two performances on Austin City Limits in 1983 and 1989. The film was released as a DVD on September 3, 1997.

Track listing
Tracks 1-3 were recorded on December 13, 1983. Tracks 4-9 recorded October 10, 1989.
"Pride and Joy" (Stevie Ray Vaughan)
"Texas Flood" (Larry Davis, Joseph Wade Scott)
"Voodoo Chile (Slight Return)" (Jimi Hendrix)
"The House Is Rockin'" (Doyle Bramhall, Stevie Ray Vaughan)
"Tightrope" (Doyle Bramhall, Stevie Ray Vaughan)
"Leave My Girl Alone" (Buddy Guy)
"Cold Shot" (W. C. Clark, Michael Kindred)
"Crossfire" (Bill Carter, Ruth Ellsworth, Chris Layton, Tommy Shannon, Reese Wynans)
"Riviera Paradise" (Stevie Ray Vaughan)
"Tick Tock" (Jerry Lynn Williams, Jimmie Vaughan, Nile Rodgers)
"Little Wing" [music video] (Jimi Hendrix)

Stevie Ray Vaughan video albums
1995 video albums
Live video albums
1995 live albums